Jonathan Russell (February 27, 1771 – February 17, 1832) was a United States representative from Massachusetts and diplomat. He served the 11th congressional district from 1821 to 1823 and was the first chair of the House Committee on Foreign Affairs.

Early life
Jonathan Russell was born in Providence, Rhode Island on February 27, 1771, the son of Jonathan and Abigail (Russell) Russell. He attended the local schools and graduated from Rhode Island College (now Brown University) with a Bachelor of Arts in 1791 and a Master of Arts in 1794. He studied law and was admitted to the bar, but did not practice. He engaged in the mercantile business in partnership with Otis Ammidon, importing goods from Europe for sale in America. In 1801 he was appointed U.S. Collector of Customs for the Port of Bristol.

Diplomatic career
In 1811, Russell was appointed by President James Madison as Chargé d'Affaires and in Paris and he acted as Minister to France following the departure of John Armstrong Jr. and prior to the arrival of Armstrong's successor, Joel Barlow. He soon transferred to England, where he was Chargé d'Affaires and acting Minister when war was declared by the United States in 1812. He was Minister to Sweden and Norway from January 18, 1814 to October 16, 1818.

Russell was one of the five commissioners who negotiated the Treaty of Ghent with Great Britain in 1814, which ended the War of 1812. In 1817, Russell received the honorary degree of LL.D. from Brown University. He returned to the United States in 1818 and settled in Mendon, Massachusetts.

He became a member of the Massachusetts House of Representatives in 1820, and also served as a delegate to that year's state constitutional convention.

Member of Congress
In November 1820, Russell was elected to the United States House of Representatives. He served in the Seventeenth Congress (March 4, 1821 – March 3, 1823), and was chair of the Committee on Foreign Affairs, the first individual to hold this position.

Feud with John Quincy Adams
In 1822, Russell authored a pamphlet accusing John Quincy Adams, one of Russell's fellow negotiators at Ghent in 1814, of having favored British interests in those treaty talks. Russell intended the pamphlet to further Henry Clay's presidential candidacy against Adams in the 1824 election. Adams's responsive pamphlets were so devastating in impugning Russell's veracity that they engendered the phrase "to Jonathan Russell" someone, meaning to refute an attacker's falsehoods so effectively that it destroys the attacker's reputation.

When the Marquis de Lafayette visited the United States in 1824 and 1825, his itinerary while in Massachusetts included an August 23, 1824 visit to Russell's home in Mendon. Russell had known Lafayette since 1811, and decorated his home for a lavish celebration with the anticipation of renewing their friendship. As United States Secretary of State and a longtime friend of Lafayette, Adams was part of Lafayette's traveling party. On the day of the planned visit, Adams humiliated Russell again by having the schedule changed without informing Russell, so that Lafayette bypassed Mendon and traveled directly to Providence.

Later life
Russell died in Milton, Massachusetts on February 17, 1832. He was interred in the family plot on his estate in Milton.

Family
In 1796, Russell married Sylvia Ammidon (1773–1811) of Mendon. In 1817, he married Lydia Smith (1786–1859). He was the father of eight children, four with each wife:

Amelia
George
Caroline
Anna
Ida
Geraldine
Rosalie
Jonathan

References

External links

1771 births
1832 deaths
Brown University alumni
Members of the Massachusetts House of Representatives
Ambassadors of the United States to Sweden
People from Milton, Massachusetts
19th-century American diplomats
19th-century American politicians
Democratic-Republican Party members of the United States House of Representatives from Massachusetts